General elections were held in Lebanon between 16 and 30 April 1972. Independent candidates won the majority of seats, although most of them were considered members of various blocs. Voter turnout was 54.4%.

Background
According to the 1960 constitution, the 99 seats were divided amongst ethnic and religious groups:

Results
The majority of MPs – 63 of the 100 – were elected as independents. However, 52 of them were considered to be members of parliamentary blocs, including 9 in the Faranjiyyah bloc, 9 in the Skaff bloc, 7 in the Assad bloc (which also included the 2 Democratic Socialist Party MPs), 7 in the Karami bloc, 6 in the Hamada bloc, 4 in the Armenian Revolutionary Federation block (which also included the party's single MP), 4 in the Arslan bloc, 3 in the Jumblatt bloc (which also included the five Progressive Socialist Party MPs) and 3 in the Salam bloc.

References

Lebanon
1972 in Lebanon
Elections in Lebanon
Election and referendum articles with incomplete results